Demis Roussos is a studio album by Greek singer Demis Roussos, released in 1978 on Philips Records (on Mercury Records in the United States).

Commercial performance 
The album spent 6 weeks on the U.S. Billboard Top LPs & Tape chart (now called Billboard 200), peaking at no. 184 on the week of July 8, 1978.

Track listing 
Produced by Freddie Perren for Grand Slam Productions.

Charts

References

External links 
 Demis Roussos –  Demis Roussos at Discogs
 Demis Roussos – Demis Roussos (Vinyl, LP, Album) at Discogs

1978 albums
Demis Roussos albums
Philips Records albums
Mercury Records albums
Albums produced by Freddie Perren